Goes is a genus of longhorn beetles, containing the following species:
 Goes debilis LeConte, 1852
 Goes fisheri Dillon & Dillon, 1941
 Goes novus Fall, 1928
 Goes pulcher (Haldeman, 1847)
 Goes pulverulentus (Haldeman, 1847)
 Goes tesselatus (Haldeman, 1847)
 Goes tigrinus (DeGeer, 1775)
 Goes tumifrons Linsley & Chemsak, 1984
 Goes variegatus Linsley & Chemsak, 1984

References

Lamiini